Run Woman Run is a Canadian drama film, directed by Zoe Leigh Hopkins and released in 2021. It stars Dakota Ray Hebert as Beck, a single mother whose life has fallen apart; when she is diagnosed with diabetes, however, she decides to pull her life back together by training to run a marathon, during which she begins to see the ghost of Tom Longboat (Asivak Koostachin) coaching and guiding her.

The cast also includes Lorne Cardinal, Braeden Clarke, Gary Farmer, Kevin Hill, Jayli Wolf, Damon Laforme, Craig Lauzon, Cody Lightning, Denise McQueen, Derek Miller, Sladen Peltier and Alex Rice.

The film premiered in April 2021 at the Santa Barbara International Film Festival. It was released theatrically in Canada by levelFILM on March 25, 2022.

Awards
At the 2021 American Indian Film Festival, the film won the award for Best Film and Hebert won the award for Best Actress. Hopkins was also nominated for Best Director, Koostachin for Best Actor, Cardinal for Best Supporting Actor and Wolf for Best Supporting Actress.

The film won the Moon Jury Award at the 2021 imagineNATIVE Film and Media Arts Festival. At the 2022 Vancouver International Women in Film Festival, it won the awards for Best Feature Film, Best Screenplay and Best Performance (Hebert).

The film was shortlisted for Best Direction in a Feature Film at the 2022 Directors Guild of Canada awards.

References

External links

Run Woman Run at Library and Archives Canada

2021 films
2021 drama films
Canadian drama films
First Nations films
Canadian Film Centre films
Films directed by Zoe Leigh Hopkins
2020s English-language films
2020s Canadian films